Minore is a village, rural locality in the NSW county of Narromine and is in Dubbo City Council.

Minore is home to around 200 people, with the major industry being agriculture, forestry & fishing. Significant geographic features include the railway station at Minore village and Minore Falls on the Macquarie River.

References

Populated places in New South Wales
Localities in New South Wales
Geography of New South Wales